This article contains information about the literary events and publications of 1851.

Events
January 1 – The Caucasian Georgian theatre company gives its first performance, under the direction of Giorgi Eristavi.
June 5 – Harriet Beecher Stowe's novel Uncle Tom's Cabin begins serialization in the American abolitionist weekly The National Era.
June – While waiting to cross the English Channel on his honeymoon, Matthew Arnold probably begins to compose the poem "Dover Beach".
September 29 – Marian Evans, the future George Eliot, takes up an appointment as (assistant) editor of the Westminster Review, published by John Chapman. In this capacity she will meet G. H. Lewes.
November 14 – Herman Melville's novel Moby-Dick; or, The Whale is published in full, in a single volume, for the first time, by Harper & Brothers in New York, having been previously issued on October 18 as The Whale in an abridged three-volume edition by Richard Bentley in London.
December 2 – The French coup d'état of 1851 prompts Victor Hugo to be a leader of an unsuccessful insurrection against it. He is forced into exile, initially to Brussels.
December 24 – A fire at the Library of Congress in Washington, D.C., destroys 35,000 books, about two–thirds of the collection.
unknown dates
Akabi's Story (Akabi Hikayesi), by Vartan Pasha, is published - an early example of a novel in the Turkish language printed in the Armenian alphabet
Hovhannes Hisarian publishes Khosrov yev Makruhi (Khosrov and Makruhi), the first romantic novel in the Armenian language, written in the vernacular Ashkharhabar dialect. 
Stephanos Th. Xenos publishes his "Istanbul novel" The Devil in Turkey; Or Scenes in Constantinople in English translated from his Greek manuscript, in London.
Philosopher Auguste Comte includes a list of 150 books which a well-educated person should have read in his Catéchisme positiviste .
Albertus Willem Sijthoff establishes a publishing business at Leiden.

New books

Fiction
Jules Barbey d'Aurevilly – Une Vieille Maîtresse (An Old Mistress)
George Borrow – Lavengro: The Scholar, the Gypsy and the Priest (novelized memoir of Romany life)
Mathilde Fibiger – Clara Raphael, Tolv Breve (Clara Raphael, Twelve Letters)
Elizabeth Gaskell – Cranford (serialization begins)
Nathaniel Hawthorne – The House of the Seven Gables
Gottfried Keller – Der Grüne Heinrich
Sheridan Le Fanu
Ghost Stories and Tales of Mystery
The Watcher
Herman Melville – Moby-Dick
John Ruskin – The King of the Golden River
Jules Verne – A Drama in Mexico (Un drame au Mexique) short story
Harriet Ward – Jasper Lyle: A Tale of Kafirland [sic]

Children and young people
W. H. G. Kingston – Peter the Whaler

Drama
Edward Bulwer-Lytton – Not So Bad as We Seem, or, Many Sides to a Character: A Comedy in Five Acts
Ferdinand Dugué – Salvator Rosa
Franz Grillparzer – The Jewess of Toledo (Die Jüdin von Toledo, written)
Eugène Marin Labiche with Marc Michel – Un Chapeau de paille d'Italie (An Italian Straw Hat)
 Maria Ann Lovell – Ingomar the Barbarian
Alexey Pisemsky – The Hypochondriac (published)
Eugène Scribe – Bataille de Dames

Poetry
Matthew Arnold – "Dover Beach" (probably completed; not published until 1867)
Heinrich Heine – Romanzero
Henry Wadsworth Longfellow – The Golden Legend

Non-fiction
Hans Christian Andersen – In Sweden
Gilbert Abbott à Beckett – The Comic History of Rome
Edward Creasy – The Fifteen Decisive Battles of the World
Catherine Dickens (as Lady Maria Clutterbuck) – What Shall We Have for Dinner?
Josiah Henson – The Life of Josiah Henson, Formerly a Slave, Now an Inhabitant of Canada, as Narrated by Himself
Søren Kierkegaard
For Self-Examination
On my Work as an Author
Henry Mayhew – London Labour and the London Poor (collected in book form)
Francisco de Paula Mellado – Enciclopedia moderna
Ferencz Aurelius Pulszky – A magyar jakobinusok (The Jacobins in Hungary)
John Ruskin – The Stones of Venice, vol 1

Births
February 21 – Ernst von Hesse-Wartegg, Austrian writer and traveler (died 1918)
April 13 – Helen M. Winslow, American editor, author and publisher (died 1938)
May 27 – Henry Festing Jones, English biographer, editor and lawyer (died 1928)
June – Jessie Fothergill, English novelist (died 1891)
June 11 – Mary Augusta Ward (Mrs. Humphry Ward), Tasmanian-born English novelist (died 1920)
June 29 – Jane Dieulafoy, French archeologist, novelist and journalist (died 1916)
August 23 – Alois Jirásek, Czech novelist and playwright (died 1930)
September 14 – H. E. Beunke, Dutch writer (died 1925)
September 16 – Emilia Pardo Bazán, Galician Spanish novelist (died 1921)
December 10 – Melvil Dewey, born Melville Dewey, American librarian (died 1931)

Deaths
February 1 – Mary Shelley, English novelist and essayist (born 1797) 
February 23 – Joanna Baillie, Scottish poet and dramatist (born 1762)
February 24 – Sake Dean Mahomed, author of first book in English by an Indian (born 1759)
May 23 – Richard Lalor Sheil, Irish dramatist and journalist (born 1791)
July 17 – Esther Copley, English children's writer and tractarian (born 1786)
August 1 – Harriet Lee, English novelist (born 1757)
August 10 – Heinrich Paulus, German theologian (born 1761)
September 14 – James Fenimore Cooper, American historical novelist (born 1789)
September 22 – Sarah Elizabeth Utterson, English translator and short story writer (born 1781)
December 19 – Henry Luttrell, English politician, wit and society poet (born c. 1765)
unknown date – Vanchinbalyn Gularans, Mongolian poet (unknown year of birth)

References

 
Years of the 19th century in literature